Wayne Edward Atwood (born 24 July 1964 in Caerphilly) is a Welsh retired professional darts player from Caerphilly. He is not a full-time professional player – he makes his full-time living as a plasterer. He used the nickname the Celtic Warrior for his matches. 
He played on the Professional Darts Corporation circuit

He yet to make an impression on the major tournaments having only qualified for the World Championship on two occasions – reaching the last 32 in 2004 and being knocked out in the first round in 2007.

He achieved his first major success in June 2007 by winning the Thailf Open (a non-ranked PDC event) and a €2,400 cheque. He defeated former World Champion John Part on his way to the final where he beat Gary Welding for the trophy.

On 16 April 2011, Atwood achieved a nine-dart finish in the first round of the 2011 UK Open Qualifier 5 in Barnsley against Nigel Heydon, making him the first ever Welshman to hit a 'nine-darter' in a PDC tournament.

World Championship results

PDC
 2004: Last 32: (lost to Peter Manley 3–4)
 2007: Last 64: (lost to Chris Mason 0–3)

References

External links
Infodarts Dutch web site with player profiles.

1964 births
Living people
Welsh darts players
Professional Darts Corporation former tour card holders